Eschweilera potaroensis is a species of woody plant in the family Lecythidaceae. It is found only in Guyana.

References

potaroensis
Flora of Guyana
Data deficient plants
Taxonomy articles created by Polbot